Wulfenia: Mitteilungen des Kärntner Botanikzentrums is a print-only peer-reviewed scientific journal of botany  published by the Regional Museum of Carinthia. It was established in 1998 and the editor-in-chief is Roland K. Eberwein (Carinthian Botanic Center).

Scam 
Wulfenia journal is one of the first hijacked journals. The journal has been the subject of an online scam, with fake web addresses such as www.wulfeniajournal.at, www.wulfeniajournal.com, and www.multidisciplinarywulfenia.org illegally re-posting copies of the original journal articles and inviting scientists to pay large fees before their works are considered for "publication".

Abstracting and indexing 
The journal is abstracted and indexed in:

According to the Journal Citation Reports, the journal has a 2011 impact factor of 0.267, ranking it 178th out of 190 journals in the category "Plant Sciences".

References

External links 
 

Annual journals
Botany journals
English-language journals
Publications established in 1994
Academic journals published by museums
Hijacked journals